William Hall Paulhamus (March 4, 1865 – April 15, 1925) was an American politician in the state of Washington. He served Washington State Senate from 1907 to 1913. From 1911 to 1913, he was President pro tempore of the Senate.

References

1865 births
1925 deaths
Republican Party Washington (state) state senators